Gorenji Lazi is a small settlement in the hills above Žlebič in the Municipality of Ribnica in southern Slovenia. The entire area is part of the traditional region of Lower Carniola and is now included in the Southeast Slovenia Statistical Region.

Name
The name Gorenji Lazi means 'upper clearings', contrasting with nearby Dolenji Lazi (literally, 'lower clearings'), which lies about  lower in elevation. The name refers to land that was cleared for settlement.

References

External links
Gorenji Lazi on Geopedia

Populated places in the Municipality of Ribnica